Rubén Martínez Dalmau (born 17 November 1970) is a Spanish teacher, jurist and politician from Podemos and Second Vice President of the Generalitat Valenciana from June 2019 to September 2021.

References

1970 births
Vice Presidents of the Valencian Community
Members of the Corts Valencianes
Podemos (Spanish political party) politicians
Living people